ECAT may refer to
 Emergency Committee for American Trade
 Escambia County Area Transit
 Energy Catalyzer (sometimes shortened to E-Cat)
 ECAT Pakistan